Anna Mikhaylovna Lisitsyna (Veps: Anna Lisicina, Mihailan tütär; 14 February 1922 – 3 August 1942) was a Soviet partisan who was posthumously awarded the title Hero of the Soviet Union on 25 September 1943 for her resistance activities.

Early life 
Lisitsyna was born on 14 February 1922 to a Vepsian family in Zhitnoruchey, Karelia. After graduating from secondary school in Rybreka she studied to become a librarian from 1938 to 1940 in Leningrad, after which she worked as a librarian at the Segezha Regional Club until the German invasion of the Soviet Union. She was a member of the Komsomol and enjoyed sports, including cycling, skiing, and sharpshooting, which later proved to be useful skills when she was a partisan.

Partisan activities
On 15 June 1942 Lisitsyna, fellow partisan Mariya Melentyeva, and six other partisans were sent by the Red Army behind enemy lines in Leningrad for a one-month reconnaissance-in-force mission, where the two were assigned to establish an underground Komsomol Committee and construct safehouses for other partisans in Sheltozero in addition to gathering information on enemy forces, fortresses, and firing points. A village elder where she was stationed assisted in establishing the Komsomol division, which spread anti-axis leaflets in prisoner-of-war camps and in Finnish Army barracks. After pinpointing locations of Axis garrisons for the Soviet Airforce to bomb and lists of names of several individuals who had assisted the Axis, the partisans were told they would have to return to Soviet-controlled territory alone because the aircraft assigned to transporting them could not make the trip. The journey required the partisans to cross the Svir river, which was icy but not frozen. When they discovered the small boat intended for the crossing was gone, they constructed a haphazard raft that fell apart during the crossing. After she fell into the water she removed her heavy dress and placed the important documents on her head under her hat; due to the temperature of the water Lisitsyna developed cramps so bad she couldn't move, but couldn't yell for help because there were several enemy camps on the shore. Melentyeva tried to save Lisitsyna but couldn't carry her across the river, so she left Lisitsyna behind and took the documents from Lisitsyna with her.

Recognition 
Lisitsyna was posthumously awarded the title Hero of the Soviet Union on 25 September 1943 by decree of the Supreme Soviet. The street named after her in Petrozavodsk bears a memorial plaque to her and her image was featured in the Petrozavodsk Gallery of Heroes.

See also 

 List of female Heroes of the Soviet Union
 Soviet partisans

References

1922 births
1942 deaths
People from Prionezhsky District
Soviet partisans
Female resistance members of World War II
Heroes of the Soviet Union
Recipients of the Order of Lenin
Soviet civilians killed in World War II